The Southland Conference's Women’s Basketball Tournament began in 1983, with the winner of the tournament receiving the conference's automatic bid into the NCAA Division I women's basketball tournament.  There was no tournament from 1984-1987, but in 1988 the season-ending tradition returned for good, with a format much as in the men's tournament, with opening rounds at the home court of the higher seed, and a designated location thereafter.

Starting in 2007, both the men's and women's tournaments were played at the same neutral site, for all rounds.

The tournament was held at the Leonard E. Merrell Center in the Houston suburb of Katy, Texas from 2008 to 2022. Starting in 2023, the event will move to The Legacy Center on the campus of McNeese State University in Lake Charles, Louisiana, reportedly as part of a deal that kept McNeese in the Southland after it had been courted by Conference USA and nearly joined the Western Athletic Conference.

Tournament results

Performance by school

 Teams in bold represent current conference members as of the 2022–23 basketball season.

See also
Southland Conference men's basketball tournament

References